Cesari is an Italian surname. Notable people with the surname include:

Giuseppe Cesari (c. 1568 – 1640), Italian mannerist painter
Lamberto Cesari (1910–1990), Italian mathematician
Velleda Cesari (1920–2003), Italian fencer
Bernardino Cesari (1565–1621), Italian painter
Rick Cesari, advertising producer
Giovanni Cesari (1843–1904), Italian singer
Bruno Cesari (1933–2004), Italian art decorator

Italian-language surnames